Georgi Karaneychev (born 9 June 1988) is a Bulgarian footballer who plays as a forward for Einherji.

Career
Karaneychev started to play football at FC Trayana Stara Zagora. After that he played for FC Hebros, Chavdar Byala Slatina and FC Svilengrad 1921.

He made his competitive debut for Loko Mezdra on 8 November 2008 against Lokomotiv Plovdiv in the twelfth round of the Bulgarian top division. A few days later Karaneychev made his debut for Bulgaria U21 in a friendly match against Romania U21.

In the summer of 2015, Karaneychev underwent a trial with Beroe.

On 12 May 2017, Karaneychev joined Icelandic club KF Fjarðabyggðar.  In January 2018, he moved to Bulgarian Second League side Strumska Slava Radomir but left the club at the end of the 2017–18 season.

References

External links

1988 births
Living people
People from Haskovo
Bulgarian footballers
Bulgaria under-21 international footballers
First Professional Football League (Bulgaria) players
Second Professional Football League (Bulgaria) players
Moldovan Super Liga players
Kazakhstan Premier League players
PFC Lokomotiv Mezdra players
PFC Ludogorets Razgrad players
OFC Sliven 2000 players
PFC Pirin Gotse Delchev players
FC Tiraspol players
FC Lokomotiv Gorna Oryahovitsa players
FC Dacia Chișinău players
FC Strumska Slava Radomir players
Bulgarian expatriate footballers
Bulgarian expatriate sportspeople in Moldova
Bulgarian expatriate sportspeople in Kazakhstan
Expatriate footballers in Moldova
Expatriate footballers in Kazakhstan
Expatriate footballers in Iceland
Association football forwards
Bulgarian expatriate sportspeople in Iceland
Georgi Karaneychev
Sportspeople from Haskovo Province